Ab Kabud-e Sofla (also Romanized as Āb Kabūd-e Soflá; also known as Ābkabūd) is a village in Lalar and Katak Rural District, Chelo District, Andika County, Khuzestan Province, Iran. At the 2006 census, its population was 26, in 6 families.

References 

Populated places in Andika County